Hackelia (stickseeds) is a genus of plants in the borage family, Boraginaceae. They are found in North America and southeast Asia. Of the approximately 40 species described, 10 are endemic to California.

The genus was named after Josef Hackel, a Czech botanist. The common name, stickseed, refers to the tendency of the barbed nutlets to stick to animal fur.

Selected species:
 Hackelia amethystina - amethyst stickseed
 Hackelia bella - greater showy stickseed
 Hackelia besseyi (Rydb.) J.L. Gentry - Bessey's stickseed
 Hackelia brevicula - Poison Canyon stickseed
 Hackelia californica - California stickseed
 Hackelia cinerea - gray stickseed
 Hackelia cronquistii - Cronquist's stickseed
 Hackelia cusickii - Cusick's stickseed
 Hackelia diffusa - Spreading stickseed
 Hackelia floribunda - manyflower stickseed
 Hackelia hispida - showy stickseed
 Hackelia micrantha - Jessica sticktight
 Hackelia mundula - pink stickseed
 Hackelia patens - spotted stickseed
 Hackelia nervosa - Sierra stickseed
 Hackelia setosa - bristly stickseed
 Hackelia sharsmithii - Sharsmith's stickseed
 Hackelia velutina - velvet stickseed
 Hackelia venusta - lesser showy stickseed
 Hackelia virginiana - beggar's lice

References

External links
USDA Plants Profile
Calflora Database: Hackelia species index in California
Jepson Manual eFlora (TJM2) treatment of Hackelia in California

 
Boraginaceae genera